The 1963–64 UCLA Bruins men's basketball team won its first NCAA National Basketball Championship under head coach John R. Wooden in his 16th year at UCLA. Assistant coach Jerry Norman convinced a reluctant Wooden to use the zone press, which the team had never utilized before. The press quickened the pace of the game and was influential in the first two national titles won by the Bruins, who were undersized.

In the national title game, the Bruins defeated Duke, coached by Vic Bubas, by the score of 98–83. Walt Hazzard of UCLA was named the tournament's Most Outstanding Player. It was the team's 30th consecutive win, played before 10,684 fans in Municipal Auditorium, Kansas City, Missouri, March 21, 1964.

High scorers were Gail Goodrich, 27 points; Kenny Washington, 26; Jack Hirsch, 13; and Hazzard, 11. Hazzard, Keith Erickson and Duke's Jeff Mullins fouled out of the game.

In the semi-final game, Erickson and Hazzard scored 28 and 19 points respectively to help UCLA to defeat Kansas State 90–84 on March 20.

Roster

Schedule

|-
!colspan=9 style=|Regular Season

|-
!colspan=12 style="background:#;"| NCAA Tournament

Source

Notes
  In the Los Angeles Basketball Classic, UCLA defeated then third-ranked Michigan, 98-80 in front of 14,241 in the Sports Arena.
 The half time National Championship game score was UCLA 50, Duke 38.
 Duke's height was no advantage. Duke had two 6-foot-10-inch (2.08 m) players — Hack Tison and Jay Buckley.
 By winning the Championships, six Bruins automatically qualified for trials on the United States Olympic basketball team.
 Hazzard received All-American honors for the second consecutive season, and was named the nation's Player of the Year by the Helms Athletic Foundation/USBWA.
 Hazzard finished the season with 1,401 points, the all-time leading scorer.
 Goodrich and Hirsch were named All-AAWU first team.
 Wooden was the UPI's Coach of the Year for the first time.
 The team will be inducted into the National Collegiate Basketball Hall of Fame as part of the Class of 2020 in 2021.

Draft list
 Walt Hazzard was number 1 draft pick in the NBA draft of 1964 by the Los Angeles Lakers.

References

External links
1963–64 UCLA Bruins at Sports-Reference.com

Ucla Bruins
UCLA Bruins men's basketball seasons
NCAA Division I men's basketball tournament championship seasons
NCAA Division I men's basketball tournament Final Four seasons
Ucla
UCLA Bruins
UCLA Bruins